Expressway S74 or express road S74 is major planned road in Poland connecting express road S12 near Sulejów and S19 near Nisko. From Opatów it is going to follow the current national road 74 toward Lipnik (where it's going to cross national road 9) and further is going to follow national road 77 toward express road S19 near Nisko. 

Most of this road is still in planning stages and the exact route has not been established. A document outlining the future development of transport infrastructure issued by the Polish government in August, 2014 projects that the road will be fully completed in 2023.

References

External links
Official page of the S74 construction project near Kielce

Expressways in Poland
Proposed roads in Poland